Mahmood Bijankhan (born 1958 in Abadan) is an Iranian linguist and professor of linguistics at the University of Tehran.
He is the creator of Bijankhan Corpus and a winner of Khwarizmi International Award.
Bijankhan received his BSc in applied mathematics from the University of Texas at Arlington (1981) and his MA (1990) and PhD (1996) in linguistics from the University of Tehran. 
He is known for his research on Persian phonetics and phonology and creating Persian corpora.

Books
 Phonology: Optimality Theory, Tehran: SAMT, 2006
 A Feasibility Study for Analysis of Ezafe in Persian Using Pattern Matching, Tehran: Research Center for Culture, Art and Communication, 2008
 Persian Language and Computers (ed.), Tehran: SAMT, 2011
 Frequency Dictionary, Tehran: University of Tehran Press, 2013
 Phonetic System of the Persian Language, Tehran: SAMT, 2014

See also
 Bijankhan Corpus

References

External links
 Articles by Bijankhan
 Bijankhan Corpus
 Persian Corpora

1958 births
Living people
Linguists from Iran
University of Tehran alumni
University of Texas at Arlington alumni
Academic staff of the University of Tehran
Iranian phonologists
Phoneticians
Corpus linguists
Linguists of Persian
Grammarians of Persian
Iranian grammarians
Faculty of Letters and Humanities of the University of Tehran alumni